M.S.N. Charities is a charitable organisation established at East Godavari District of Andhra Pradesh, India, in 1915, from the will of Malladi Satyalingam Naicker, who died on 29 January 1915.

Malladi Satyalingam Naicker 

Malladi Satyalingam Naicker belongs to the Agnikulakshatriya Community. He was born at Coringa, a small village near Kakinada about 1843.

Satyalingam Naicker died in Rangoon on 29 January 1915 when he was about 75 years old.

References

Indian humanitarians
Charities based in India
Organisations based in Andhra Pradesh
1915 establishments in India
Organizations established in 1915